Darko Tofiloski (born 13 January 1986) is a Macedonian football goalkeeper.

Club career
He played for FK Pobeda in 2005 UEFA Intertoto Cup.

He was released by FC Schaffhausen in March 2010. He was suspected as one of the players involved in 2009 European football betting scandal but the investigation terminated after lack of evidence.

International career
He played at 2006, 2007 and 2009 UEFA European Under-21 Football Championship qualification.

He made his senior debut for Macedonia in a June 2013 friendly match against Norway, his sole international appearance.

References

External links
 
 Profile at Macedonian Football
 
 MFK Košice profile 

1986 births
Living people
Sportspeople from Prilep
Association football goalkeepers
Macedonian footballers
North Macedonia under-21 international footballers
North Macedonia international footballers
FK Pobeda players
FC Schaffhausen players
FC VSS Košice players
MFK Ružomberok players
FC DAC 1904 Dunajská Streda players
FC Alashkert players
FC Drita players
Macedonian First Football League players
Swiss Challenge League players
Slovak Super Liga players
Armenian Premier League players
Football Superleague of Kosovo players
Macedonian expatriate footballers
Expatriate footballers in Switzerland
Macedonian expatriate sportspeople in Switzerland
Expatriate footballers in Slovakia
Macedonian expatriate sportspeople in Slovakia
Expatriate footballers in Armenia
Macedonian expatriate sportspeople in Armenia
Expatriate footballers in Kosovo
Macedonian expatriate sportspeople in Kosovo